Salon D'Or, Homburg, is an 1871 oil painting by William Powell Frith. It is held by the Rhode Island School of Design Museum in Providence, Rhode Island.

The painting measures . Frith visited Bad Homburg in 1869 with a friend, O'Neil. The popular casino near Frankfurt was due to close in 1871 when its 30-year lease expired. Frith was following several contemporaneous works of art and literature which had focussed on gambling and casinos, including artworks such as Alfred Elmore's 1865 On the Brink and Gustave Doré's 1867 Le Tapis Vert, and literary works such as Anthony Trollope's 1864 Can You Forgive Her? and Feodor Dostoyevsky's 1869 The Gambler.

Frith used photography to capture the scene, and made many preparatory drawings and sketches to establish the final composition. The central figure is a woman in grey, turning away from the tables with blank expression, apparently having lost heavily. A man and a woman to her right look on unapprovingly: portraits of Frith and his wife.  He used a landscape format to show the crowds of fashionable people around the gambling tables.  His depiction include his typically characterful vignettes, but there are some differences between his final sketch and the completed work.  For example, in the sketch, an older man seated in the left foreground gives some money from his winnings to his mistress; in the oil painting, a younger man is seeking more money from his wife so he can keep playing.

The completed painting was exhibited at the Royal Academy summer exhibition at Burlington House in 1871, with the subtitle "Le jeu est fait - Rien ne va plus" (French: "The stakes are set – No more bets"). It received mixed reviews - some critics preferred the repulsive realism of Doré, but Frith's work became so popular with the viewing public that a barrier was erected to keep back the crowd – an accolade rarely accorded:  the previous two instances were Frith's The Derby Day in 1858, and David Wilkie's Chelsea Pensioners reading the Waterloo Dispatch in 1822.  It was also exhibited at the Exposition Universelle in Paris in 1878.

Frith then embarked on a Hogarthian series of paintings on moral subjects, The Road to Ruin, which follows the descending path of a wealthy young gentleman who becomes embroiled in gambling and loses his fortune. This series needed another rail when exhibited at the Royal Academy, also in 1878.

Frith had sold Salon D'Or to the art dealer Louis Victor Flatow in 1870 for £4,000, including the copyright. Flatow had the work engraved by the printmaker Charles George Lewis, but Frith was unhappy with the quality of the resulting prints when they were published from 1876.  Flatow sold the painting in 1874 for £1,995, without the reproduction rights.  Victorian paintings became deeply unfashionable in the early 20th century, and it was auctioned at Christie's in 1932 for just £48 6s, sold to Walter Lowry of New York.  He later donated it to the Rhode Island School of Design Museum. A smaller version  was acquired by the National Gallery of Canada in 1964.

References
 The Salon d’Or, Homburg, Rhode Island School of Design Museum
 The Salon d'Or, Homburg, National Gallery of Canada
  European Painting and Sculpture, Ca. 1770-1937, in the Museum of Art, Museum of the Rhode Island School of Design, Rhode Island School of Design
 The Salon d'Or, Homburg

Paintings by William Powell Frith
1871 paintings
Paintings in Rhode Island
Gambling in art
Collection of the Rhode Island School of Design Museum